Paranemonia vouliagmeniensis, or Greek anemone, is an endangered sea anemone that occurs only in Lake Vouliagmeni, Athens. The lake's status as a spa has contributed negatively to the species' livelihood and population; while no formal population monitoring has taken place, it has been estimated that the population has decreased by over 50% from 2007-2017. Paranemonia vouliagmeniensis has large embryos that can be found in the tentacles, unlike other species in the same genus. It also has a greater size range than other sea anemone.

References

Actiniidae
Endemic fauna of Greece
Animals described in 1987
Species endangered by tourism
Species endangered by habitat loss